State Highway 49A (SH-49A) also known as Rajiv Gandhi Salai and Rajiv Gandhi IT Expressway or just IT Expressway is a major road connecting Chennai, Tamil Nadu with Mahabalipuram in Chengalpattu district, Tamil Nadu. It is 45 km long and was earlier known as the Old Mahabalipuram Road (OMR). The road starts from Madhya Kailash Temple on Sardar Patel Road in South-East Chennai and terminates on East Coast Road near Mahabalipuram.

The prestigious TIDEL Park, home to a number of BPO and IT/ITES companies and many other major IT/ITES Companies in the country are situated along the Rajiv Gandhi Salai. Prominent technical and educational Institutions, national research laboratories are also located along the Corridor.

Besides, State Industries Promotion Corporation of Tamil Nadu Ltd (SIPCOT) has developed a Cyber City, spread over 2000 acres in Siruseri, abutting the IT Corridor. Many IT/ITES Companies have set up their facilities in the Cyber City.

Based on development and growth of OMR road, it was categorized as 2 major zones. Zone-1 is from Madhya Kailash to Sholinganallur and Zone-2 is from Sholinganallur to Kelambakkam.

Toll plazas

There are two toll plazas on OMR and three on the roads leading to OMR.

 Entrance toll plaza at Seevaram (Perungudi)
 Exit plaza at Egattur
 Satellite toll plaza on 200 feet Thoraipakkam-Pallavaram radial road
 Satellite toll plaza on Sholinganallur-Medavakkam link road
 Satellite toll plaza on Sholinganallur-ECR link road (Kalaignar Karunanidhi Salai)

Gallery

See also

 Transport in Chennai
 List of tech parks in Chennai

References

External links

 The Federation of OMR Residents Associations 
 "the Road to The future" - IT Corridor (home page) 
 Newindpress - One for the Road 
 SIPCOT IT Park map

State highways in Tamil Nadu
Roads in Chennai
Information technology industry of Chennai